David Riches (born 1961) is a former Scottish international rower who participated in the 1986 Commonwealth Games.

Rowing career
Riches was part of the coxless pairs crew, with Ewan Pearson that won the national title rowing for Molesey Boat Club, at the 1985 National Rowing Championships. The following year the pair participated in the 1986 Commonwealth Games, where he won a bronze medal in the men's coxless pairs. He was a double winner of the Silver Goblets & Nickalls' Challenge Cup in 1984 and 1985.

References

1961 births
Living people
Scottish male rowers
Commonwealth Games bronze medallists for Scotland
Rowers at the 1986 Commonwealth Games
Commonwealth Games medallists in rowing
Medallists at the 1986 Commonwealth Games